"Not That Far Away" is a song recorded by American singer and actress Jennette McCurdy from her debut EP of the same name. Written by McCurdy, Blair Daly and Rachel Proctor, it was released to country radio on May 24, 2010, and as a music download on June 1, 2010.

Content
"Not That Far Away" is an up-tempo Country Pop song featuring prominent banjo and electric guitar with steel guitar fills. The song's female narrator describes the scenario of a young girl, who dreams of becoming a country artist, heading out of town to Nashville, Tennessee in pursuit of her dream. In leaving, she finds herself assuring her mother that she is "not that far away" from her hometown in California.

McCurdy said that "this song really captures the last year of my life. I've been in Nashville writing for and recording my record and following my dream while really missing my family and friends back in Garden Grove, California." The single was chosen in a fan-voted poll that featured samples of six songs from her upcoming record; "Not That Far Away," with 30% of the total votes, was selected for release.

Reception
Jim Malec of The 9513 gave the song a thumbs down, comparing the song unfavorably with something Carrie Underwood might record. He stated that while he believes McCurdy "proves herself a generally capable vocalist," he noted that her voice "lacks Underwood’s pristine tonal quality, outstanding vocal control and incredible power."

Jim Kiest remarked, "A perfectly credible, fairly forgettable, country debut about chasing dreams...Fans of her show might have been expecting McCurdy to be a mean-girl counterpart to Taylor Swift; keep hoping, kids, but it hasn't happened yet."

Music video
The music video, which was directed by Roman White and shot in Watertown, Tennessee, premiered on Nickelodeon and CMT on August 14, 2010. In the video, McCurdy is shown moving into a new home, arranging furniture and putting up pictures of her alongside her mother. She then takes her guitar and walks through town, eventually making her way to a coffee shop, where she performs the song during open mic night. Throughout the video, McCurdy is also shown talking on the phone and writing in a journal, as well as singing the song from various locations.

Track listing
Not That Far Away (single)

Credits and personnel 
Credits adapted from single liner notes.
 Jennette McCurdy – vocals, songwriter
 Rachel Proctor – songwriter
 Blair Daly – songwriter
 Paul Worley – production
 Andrew Mendelson – mastering
 Shelley Anderson – mastering assistant
 Daniel Bacigalupi – mastering assistant
 Natthaphol Abhigantaphand – mastering assistant
 Clarke Schleicher – mixing, recording
 Andrew Bazinet – recording
 Steve Blackmon – recording
 John Napier – recording
 Jeremy Witt – production assistant
 Paige Conners – production coordination

Chart performance
"Not That Far Away" debuted and peaked at number 58 on the U.S. Billboard Hot Country Songs chart for the week of July 10, 2010.

Release history

References

Jennette McCurdy songs
2010 debut singles
Songs written by Rachel Proctor
Songs written by Blair Daly
Song recordings produced by Paul Worley
Music videos directed by Roman White
Capitol Records Nashville singles
2010 songs
Songs written by Jennette McCurdy